The Moorish Queen (Spanish:La reina mora) is a 1955 Spanish musical film directed by Raúl Alfonso and starring Antoñita Moreno, Pepe Marchena and Miguel Ligero. It is based on a zarzuela which had previously been made into a 1922 silent film and a 1937 sound film.

It was shot in Ferraniacolor.

Synopsis 
During the April Fair in Seville, Esteban wounds his rival Antonio in a fight. Coral, Esteban's girlfriend, asks Cotufo, her brother, to change their address, since she wants to live in isolation while her boyfriend remains in jail. Cotufo agrees and both brothers move to a mansion where, according to legend, a Christian and the daughter of a Moorish king lived three hundred years ago. She this she died of love sorrow and the legend adds that a goblin has lived in the house since then.

Cast

References

Bibliography 
 D'Lugo, Marvin. Guide to the Cinema of Spain. Greenwood Publishing, 1997.

External links 
 

1955 musical films
Spanish musical films
1955 films
1950s Spanish-language films
1950s Spanish films